XHQRV-FM is a radio station on 92.5 FM in El Pando, Veracruz, Veracruz, Mexico, carrying the news and talk programs of Imagen Radio.

History

In 1972, XEJPM-AM 1510 received its concession. The station broadcast from Villa Cardel as a daytimer with 500 watts and took its calls from its original concessionaire and owner, José Pinto Meneses.

The 1980s were an eventful decade for XEJPM that saw almost every characteristic of the station change. In 1982, Radio Costera, S.A., acquired XEJPM. In 1984, the callsign was changed to XEQRV-AM. This was followed in 1986 by the relocation of XEQRV to El Pando, along with a frequency change to 770 kHz, as well as an increase in power to 1,000 watts and the beginning of nighttime operation with 500 watts. In 1989, daytime power was ramped up further, to 5,000 watts. These power levels remained through the AM-FM migration.

Until 2015, XHQRV carried a pop format known as Ultra. Imagen acquired XHQRV in 2015 and flipped the station to its Imagen Radio format.

References

External links
Imagen Radio 92.5 Facebook

Radio stations in Veracruz
Radio stations established in 1972
Grupo Imagen